Maria Hajara Braimoh (born 19 January 1990) is a Nigerian badminton player. She was part of the national team that won the gold medals at the 2007 and 2011 All-Africa Games. Braimoh competed at the 2010 Commonwealth Games in New Delhi, India.

Achievements

All-Africa Games 
Women's singles

Women's doubles

African Championships 
Women's singles

Women's doubles

BWF International Challenge/Series
Women's doubles

 BWF International Challenge tournament
 BWF International Series tournament
 BWF Future Series tournament

References

External links
 

1990 births
Living people
Nigerian female badminton players
Badminton players at the 2010 Commonwealth Games
Commonwealth Games competitors for Nigeria
Competitors at the 2007 All-Africa Games
Competitors at the 2011 All-Africa Games
Competitors at the 2015 African Games
African Games gold medalists for Nigeria
African Games bronze medalists for Nigeria
African Games medalists in badminton
21st-century Nigerian women